The Bristow Firestone Service Station, at 321 N. Main in Bristow, Oklahoma, was built in 1929.   It was listed on the National Register of Historic Places in 2007.

Known also as the Mounce Building, it is an L-shaped, one-story building with Art Deco styling.

References

External links

Gas stations on the National Register of Historic Places in Oklahoma
National Register of Historic Places in Creek County, Oklahoma
Art Deco architecture in Oklahoma
Buildings and structures completed in 1929